Alexandra Burghardt (born 28 April 1994) is a German sprinter and bobsledder.

Career
She competed in the 4 × 100 metres relay at the 2015 World Championships in Beijing, finishing fifth in the final.

At the 2020 Summer Olympics in Tokyo, Burghardt finished fifth as a member of the 4 × 100 m relay on 6 August 2021. She returned to the bobsleigh track of the 2022 Winter Olympics in Beijing half a year later, winning the silver medal on 19 February 2022.

Athletics international competitions

1Did not finish

Bobsleigh international competitions

Personal bests
Outdoor
100 metres – 11.01 (+1.8 m/s, Bulle 2021)

Indoor
60 metres – 7.19 (Belgrade 2017)

References

External links
 
 
 
 
 
 
 
 Alexandra Burghardt at the Bob und Schlittenverband Deutschland 

1994 births
Living people
Athletes (track and field) at the 2020 Summer Olympics
German female sprinters
Olympic athletes of Germany
Olympic female sprinters
People from Mühldorf
Sportspeople from Upper Bavaria
World Athletics Championships athletes for Germany
Bobsledders at the 2022 Winter Olympics
Olympic bobsledders of Germany
Olympic silver medalists for Germany
Medalists at the 2022 Winter Olympics
Olympic medalists in bobsleigh
20th-century German women
21st-century German women
European Athletics Championships winners